Emamzadeh Esmail (also Romanized as Emāmzādeh Esmā‘īl) is a village in Shalil Rural District, Miankuh District, Ardal County, Chaharmahal and Bakhtiari Province, Iran. At the 2006 census, its population was 33, in 6 families. The village is populated by Lurs.

References 

Populated places in Ardal County
Luri settlements in Chaharmahal and Bakhtiari Province